Crystal Creamery (formerly Foster Farms Dairy) was founded in 1901 by Max and Verda Foster in Modesto, California, a venture following their 1939 founding of Foster Farms. The company claims to be the "largest privately owned dairy in California." 

In 2007, Foster Farms acquired Crystal Cream and Butter Company, based in Sacramento, from HP Hood.  In 2009, Foster Farms Dairy acquired Humboldt Creamery, based in Fernbridge, California (near Eureka).  During 2012–2013, the company re-branded itself as Crystal Creamery. Crystal Creamery's 120th Anniversary has started on 2021.

See also
 Dairy farming

References

External links

Dairy products companies in California
Agriculture in California

Companies based in Stanislaus County, California
Food and drink companies established in 1941
1941 establishments in California